Wayne Campbell (born 23 September 1972) is a retired Australian rules football player and administrator for the Richmond Football Club in the AFL. He also had assistant coaching roles at the Western Bulldogs for two years.

On 29 December 2013, it was announced that Campbell had been appointed as the AFL National Umpiring Director replacing Jeff Gieschen and he commenced in his new role in mid-January 2014.

Richmond career

Playing career
Campbell joined Richmond via the 1989 National Draft being the club's fifth pick (No. 29 overall).
In a 15 season career from 1991 until 2005, Campbell played 297 games, three games short of the coveted 300-game milestone and the fourth-most in club history. He was club captain from 2001 to 2004 and was succeeded by Kane Johnson. Campbell was regarded as a very consistent player who played in the forward line, the backline and on the wing, before becoming the prime mover in the Richmond midfield during the mid-to-late 1990s with a reputation as a first-class decision maker.

Campbell won the Jack Dyer Medal (the award for the Best and Fairest player at the Richmond Football Club) four times, in 1995, 1997, 1999 and 2002. He was also runner-up in 1992, 1993 and 2001. He placed third for the award in 1998.

Campbell also received two All-Australian guernseys (awarded to players adjudged the best in their positions in the AFL competition) in 1995 and 1999. In addition, he represented Victoria in State of Origin matches and Australia in International Rules Series matches.

In 1995 he was favourite to win the Brownlow Medal (awarded to the Best and Fairest player in the AFL competition), having won various other media awards, but he polled poorly.

In June 2013, Campbell was inducted into the Richmond Hall of Fame.

Coaching and administration career
Campbell had a five year stint in non-playing roles at Richmond, his last being Manager of VFL Strategy. Richmond’s General Manager of Football, Dan Richardson, praised Campbell's work with the club saying, "Most recently, he has done an outstanding job in developing and implementing the strategy aligned to the establishment of the Club’s new VFL team."

Campbell was an assistant coach at the Western Bulldogs for two years (2007 and 2008), under Rodney Eade.

Statistics

|-
|- style="background-color: #EAEAEA"
! scope="row" style="text-align:center" | 1991
|style="text-align:center;"|
| 46 || 12 || 5 || 6 || 143 || 66 || 209 || 36 || 21 || 0.4 || 0.5 || 11.9 || 5.5 || 17.4 || 3.0 || 1.8 || 0
|-
! scope="row" style="text-align:center" | 1992
|style="text-align:center;"|
| 9 || 21 || 21 || 10 || 331 || 224 || 555 || 100 || 28 || 1.0 || 0.5 || 15.8 || 10.7 || 26.4 || 4.8 || 1.3 || 3
|- style="background-color: #EAEAEA"
! scope="row" style="text-align:center" | 1993
|style="text-align:center;"|
| 9 || 20 || 8 || 16 || 335 || 152 || 487 || 92 || 34 || 0.4 || 0.8 || 16.8 || 7.6 || 24.4 || 4.6 || 1.7 || 5
|-
! scope="row" style="text-align:center" | 1994
|style="text-align:center;"|
| 9 || 20 || 11 || 11 || 243 || 153 || 396 || 54 || 26 || 0.6 || 0.6 || 12.2 || 7.7 || 19.8 || 2.7 || 1.3 || 0
|- style="background-color: #EAEAEA"
! scope="row" style="text-align:center" | 1995
|style="text-align:center;"|
| 9 || 25 || 16 || 15 || 420 || 174 || 594 || 90 || 39 || 0.6 || 0.6 || 16.8 || 7.0 || 23.8 || 3.6 || 1.6 || 10
|-
! scope="row" style="text-align:center" | 1996
|style="text-align:center;"|
| 9 || 21 || 15 || 11 || 325 || 181 || 506 || 67 || 41 || 0.7 || 0.5 || 15.5 || 8.6 || 24.1 || 3.2 || 2.0 || 4
|- style="background-color: #EAEAEA"
! scope="row" style="text-align:center" | 1997
|style="text-align:center;"|
| 9 || 21 || 4 || 7 || 350 || 205 || 555 || 83 || 37 || 0.2 || 0.3 || 16.7 || 9.8 || 26.4 || 4.0 || 1.8 || 6
|-
! scope="row" style="text-align:center" | 1998
|style="text-align:center;"|
| 9 || 21 || 13 || 6 || 311 || 244 || 555 || 68 || 65 || 0.6 || 0.3 || 14.8 || 11.6 || 26.4 || 3.2 || 3.1 || 4
|- style="background-color: #EAEAEA"
! scope="row" style="text-align:center" | 1999
|style="text-align:center;"|
| 9 || 22 || 17 || 4 || 380 || 175 || 555 || 94 || 35 || 0.8 || 0.2 || 17.3 || 8.0 || 25.2 || 4.3 || 1.6 || 10
|-
! scope="row" style="text-align:center" | 2000
|style="text-align:center;"|
| 9 || 17 || 14 || 6 || 239 || 147 || 386 || 99 || 35 || 0.8 || 0.4 || 14.1 || 8.6 || 22.7 || 5.8 || 2.1 || 7
|- style="background-color: #EAEAEA"
! scope="row" style="text-align:center" | 2001
|style="text-align:center;"|
| 9 || 25 || 16 || 8 || 346 || 261 || 607 || 114 || 71 || 0.6 || 0.3 || 13.8 || 10.4 || 24.3 || 4.6 || 2.8 || 4
|-
! scope="row" style="text-align:center" | 2002
|style="text-align:center;"|
| 9 || 22 || 12 || 7 || 297 || 216 || 513 || 91 || 69 || 0.5 || 0.3 || 13.5 || 9.8 || 23.3 || 4.1 || 3.1 || 8
|- style="background-color: #EAEAEA"
! scope="row" style="text-align:center" | 2003
|style="text-align:center;"|
| 9 || 9 || 5 || 4 || 116 || 68 || 184 || 44 || 13 || 0.6 || 0.4 || 12.9 || 7.6 || 20.4 || 4.9 || 1.4 || 6
|-
! scope="row" style="text-align:center" | 2004
|style="text-align:center;"|
| 17 || 19 || 2 || 1 || 237 || 180 || 417 || 97 || 49 || 0.1 || 0.1 || 12.5 || 9.5 || 21.9 || 5.1 || 2.6 || 1
|- style="background-color: #EAEAEA"
! scope="row" style="text-align:center" | 2005
|style="text-align:center;"|
| 9 || 22 || 13 || 6 || 201 || 206 || 407 || 114 || 32 || 0.6 || 0.3 || 9.1 || 9.4 || 18.5 || 5.2 || 1.5 || 2
|- class="sortbottom"
! colspan=3| Career
! 297
! 172
! 118
! 4274
! 2652
! 6926
! 1243
! 595
! 0.6
! 0.4
! 14.4
! 8.9
! 23.3
! 4.2
! 2.0
! 70
|}

References

Further reading
 Hogan P: The Tigers Of Old, Richmond FC, Melbourne 1996

External links

1972 births
Living people
Richmond Football Club players
All-Australians (AFL)
Victorian State of Origin players
Jack Dyer Medal winners
Australian rules footballers from Victoria (Australia)
Golden Square Football Club players
Australia international rules football team players